Ralph Parker may refer to:

 Ralph D. Parker (1898–1983), Canadian miner
 Ralph J. Parker (1867–1922), Minnesota politician